Dermaphoria (2005) is a novel written by American author Craig Clevenger.

Plot summary
Eric Ashworth awakens in jail, unable to remember how he got there or why. All he does remember is a woman's name: Desiree.

Bailed out and holed up in a low rent motel, Eric finds the solution to his amnesia in a strange new hallucinogen. By synthesizing the sense of touch, the drug produces a disjointed series of sensations that slowly allow Eric to remember his former life as a clandestine chemist. With steadily increasing doses, Eric reassembles his past at the expense of his grip on the present, and his distinction between truth and fantasy crumbles as his paranoia grows in tandem with his tolerance.

Characters 
 Eric Ashworth
 Desiree
 Manhattan White
 Toe Tag
 Hoyle
 Otto
 Detective Anslinger
 Jack and the Beanstalk

Reviews
 Woozy memories of a drugmaker - June Sawyers - San Francisco Chronicle
 You are what you read - Ben Popper - Memphis Flyer Online
 Dermaphoria - Luan Gaines - Curled Up
 Dermaphoria - Thomas Scott McKenzie - PopMatters

Trivia
Room 621, the room Eric Ashworth rents is also the room number belonging to Barton Fink in the Coen Brothers' movie of the same name.

Film Adaptation
The book was adapted into a film, which premiered on June 13, 2014 at the East End Film Festival. It was directed by Ross Clarke and starred Joseph Morgan, Ron Perlman, Kate Walsh, and Walton Goggins.

U.S. editions
MacAdam/Cage Publishing, October 2005.  Paperback Edition. 
MacAdam/Cage Publishing, September 2006.  Paperback Edition.

See also

 Neo-noir

Footnotes

References

External links
 Official site of movie based on Dermaphoria novel
 Official site of Craig Clevenger
 Official online community of Craig Clevenger, Will Christopher Baer, and Stephen Graham Jones
Pete's Candy Store Reading (Dermaphoria Tour)

2005 American novels
MacAdam/Cage books